Ageltrude or Agiltrude (around 860 – 27 August 923) was the Empress and Queen of Italy as the wife of Guy (reigned 891–94).   She was the regent for her son Lambert (reigned 894–98) and actively encouraged him in opposing the Carolingians, and in influencing papal elections in their favour.

Life
She was the daughter of Prince Adelchis of Benevento and Adeltrude. She married Guy in around 875, when he was still just the duke and margrave of Spoleto and Camerino.  Her spouse became King of Italy in 889, making her queen. In 891, her spouse became emperor. She was widowed when Guy died in 894. Her son was at that time a minor, and she took control as regent to protect his rights to the succession against the opposition. 

In 894, she accompanied her 14-year-old son, Lambert, to Rome to be confirmed as emperor by Pope Formosus, who supported the Carolingian claimant Arnulf of Carinthia.  In 896, she and her son fled from Rome to Spoleto when Arnulf marched into Rome and was crowned in opposition to Lambert. Arnulf was soon paralysed by a stroke and Formosus died. Ageltrude quickly interfered to assert her authority in Rome and have her candidate elected as Pope Stephen VI. At her and Lambert's request, the body of Formosus was disinterred and tried, convicted and hurled into the Tiber in the Cadaver Synod. Lambert became Lambert II of Spoleto.

In 898, her son died. She retired from politics after the death of her son and settled in the convent of Camerino and later in the convent of Salsomaggiore.

References

Further reading

Frankish queens consort
Holy Roman Empresses
German queens consort
9th-century women rulers
Italian queens consort
Lombard women
9th-century Lombard people
9th-century Italian women
10th-century Lombard people
10th-century Italian women
923 deaths
Year of birth unknown
Place of birth unknown